Austwick is a village and civil parish in the Craven district of North Yorkshire, England, about  north-west of Settle. The village is on the edge of the Yorkshire Dales National Park.

Before local government reorganisation in 1974, Austwick parish was within Settle Rural District which was in the County of the West Riding of Yorkshire.

History
The area around Austwick has been inhabited by humans for over 4,000 years.  Archaeological finds in and around the village include prehistoric burial places, a large Bronze Age settlement, and even an Iron Age settlement.  The area surrounding Austwick has many ancient remains including extensive walls and structures constructed of slate, limestone, and sandstone.

At one time, Austwick, Clapham, Lawkland, and Newby were independent manors with their own lord that together formed the larger parish of Clapham.  In the Domesday Book, which was a survey of England conducted in 1086, Austwick was the head of 12 manors spread along a northern route. Austwick still has a lord of the manor; the most recent holder of the position was Dr. John Farrer, who died in 2014.  The Farrer family has had the position of lord of the manor since 1782. Austwick Hall, a grade II listed building, is said to have originally been part of a pele tower. The building was renovated in the 17th and 19th centuries, though evidence of its purchase by the Ingilby family exists pointing to the year 1573.

A local folktale tells of an Austwick man who fell into a deep pool. As bubbles broke on the water's surface, his companions thought they could hear the words "T' b-best's at t' b-bottom", so they jumped into the pool as well, and were not seen again.

The Anglican Church in the village was originally a lecture hall, but was later converted into the Church of the Epiphany. The grade II listed structure was consecrated in 1841.

The village was originally in the Wapentake of Ewecross, later being part of the Settle Rural District within the county of the West Riding of Yorkshire. It was moved into North Yorkshire in 1974. Austwick was originally in the Parish of Settle, but was established as its own parish in May 1879.

Austwick was on the original turnpike road between Keighley and Kendal, which north west of Settle became the A65. The village was bypassed progressively in the 1980s and early 1990s.

Demographics

According to the 2001 census the parish had a population of 476 with an average age of 45.4 years (neighbouring parishes: Clapham parish 39.9 years, Lawkland parish 39.4 years, England: 38.6 years).  There are 231 dwellings and 212 households.  36% are pensioner households, 33% of households have an occupant with a long-term illness and only 25% of households have children. The parish includes the village of Austwick and the hamlet of Wharfe.

In 2014 the boundaries of Austwick parish were changed. That part of the parish south of the A65 road were passed to Lawkland parish and that part of Lawkland parish north of the A65 (including the hamlet of Feizor) was passed to Austwick parish. Now Austwick Common and Austwick Moss are no longer in the parish of Austwick. The boundaries of Austwick and Lawkland parishes had been in existence since at least 1851 at the time of the drawing up of the Tithe map.

References

Sources

External links

 Community Website
 Austwick CE VA Primary School's website
 

Villages in North Yorkshire
Civil parishes in North Yorkshire
Craven District